As a topic of economics, utility is used to model worth or value. Its usage has evolved significantly over time. The term was introduced initially as a measure of pleasure or happiness as part of the theory of utilitarianism by moral philosophers such as Jeremy Bentham and John Stuart Mill. The term has been adapted and reapplied within neoclassical economics, which dominates modern economic theory, as a utility function that represents a single consumer's preference ordering over a choice set but is not comparable across consumers. This concept of utility is personal and based on choice rather than on pleasure received, and so is specified more rigorously than the original concept but makes it less useful (and controversial) for ethical decisions.

Utility function 
Consider a set of alternatives among which a person can make a preference ordering. The utility obtained from these alternatives is an unknown function of the utilities obtained from each alternative, not the sum of each alternative. A utility function is able to represent that ordering if it is possible to assign a real number to each alternative in such a manner that alternative a is assigned a number greater than alternative b if and only if the individual prefers alternative a to alternative b. In this situation someone who selects the most preferred alternative is necessarily also selecting the alternative that maximizes the associated utility function. 

Suppose James has utility function  such that x is the number of apples and y is the number of chocolates. Alternative A has  apples and  chocolates; alternative B has  apples and  chocolates.

In general economic terms, a utility function measures preferences concerning a set of goods and services. Utility is often correlated with concepts such as happiness, satisfaction, and welfare which are difficult to measure. Thus, economists utilize consumption baskets of preferences in order to measure these abstract, nonquantifiable ideas.

Gérard Debreu precisely defined the conditions required for a preference ordering to be representable by a utility function. For a finite set of alternatives these require only that the preference ordering is complete (so the individual is able to determine which of any two alternatives is preferred or that they are equal), and that the preference order is transitive.

Very often the set of alternatives is not finite, because even if the number of goods is finite, the quantity chosen can be any real number on an interval. In this case, there exists a continuous utility function to represent a consumer's preferences if and only if the consumer's preferences are complete, transitive and continuous.

Applications

Utility is usually applied by economists to such constructs as the indifference curve, which plot the combination of commodities that an individual would accept to maintain a given level of satisfaction. Utility and indifference curves are used by economists to understand the causes of demand curves as part of supply and demand analysis, which is used to analyze the workings of goods markets.

A diagram of a general indifference curve is shown below (Figure 1). The vertical axes and the horizontal axes represent an individual's consumption of commodity Y and X respectively. All the combinations of commodity X and Y along the same indifference curve are regarded indifferently by individuals, which means all the combinations along an indifference curve result in the same value of utility.  

Individual utility and social utility can be construed as the value of a utility function and a social welfare function respectively.  When coupled with production or commodity constraints, by some assumptions these functions can be used to analyze Pareto efficiency, such as illustrated by Edgeworth boxes in contract curves. Such efficiency is a major concept in welfare economics.

In finance, utility is applied to generate an individual's price for an asset known as the indifference price.  Utility functions are also related to risk measures, with the most common example being the entropic risk measure.
For artificial intelligence, utility functions are used to convey the value of various outcomes to intelligent agents. This allows the agents to plan actions with the goal of maximizing the utility (or "value") of available choices.

Preference
Preference, as human's specific likes and dislikes, is used primarily when individuals make choices or decisions among different alternatives. Individual preferences are influenced by various factors such as geographical location, gender, cultures and education. The ranking of utility indicates individuals’ preferences. 

Although preferences are the conventional foundation of microeconomics, it is often convenient to represent preferences with a utility function and analyze human behavior indirectly with utility functions.  Let X be the consumption set, the set of all mutually-exclusive baskets the consumer could conceivably consume.  The consumer's utility function  ranks each package in the consumption set.  If the consumer strictly prefers x to y or is indifferent between them, then .

For example, suppose a consumer's consumption set is X = {nothing, 1 apple,1 orange, 1 apple and 1 orange, 2 apples, 2 oranges}, and his utility function is u(nothing) = 0, u(1 apple) = 1, u(1 orange) = 2, u(1 apple and 1 orange) = 5, u(2 apples) = 2 and u(2 oranges) = 4.  Then this consumer prefers 1 orange to 1 apple, but prefers one of each to 2 oranges.

In micro-economic models, there are usually a finite set of L commodities, and a consumer may consume an arbitrary amount of each commodity. For the example, there are two commodities: apples and oranges. Note that for u to be a utility function on X, however, it must be defined for every package in X, so now the function needs to be defined for fractional apples and oranges too. One function that would fit these numbers is 

Preferences have three main properties:

 Completeness 

Assume an individual has two choices, A and B. By ranking the two choices, one and only one of the following relationships is true: an individual strictly prefers A (A>B); an individual strictly prefers B (B>A); an individual is indifferent between A and B (A=B).
Either a ≥ b OR b ≥ a (OR both) for all (a,b)

  Transitivity 

Individuals’ preferences are consistent over bundles. If an individual prefers bundle A to bundle B, and prefers bundle B to bundle C, then it can be assumed that the individual prefers bundle A to bundle C.
(If a ≥ b and b ≥ c, then a ≥ c for all (a,b,c)).

 Non-Satiation (Monotone Preferences)

All else being constant, individuals always prefer more of positive goods rather than negative goods, vice versa. In terms of the indifferent curves, individuals will always prefer bundles that are on a higher indifference curve. In other words, all else being the same, more is better than less of the commodity.
 When a commodity is good, more of it is preferred to less.
 When a commodity is bad, less of it is preferred more, like pollution.

Revealed preference
It was recognized that utility could not be measured or observed directly, so instead economists devised a way to infer relative utilities from observed choice. These 'revealed preferences', as termed by Paul Samuelson, were revealed e.g. in people's willingness to pay: 
Utility is assumed to be correlative to Desire or Want. It has been argued already that desires cannot be measured directly, but only indirectly, by the outward phenomena which they cause: and that in those cases with which economics is mainly concerned the measure is found by the price which a person is willing to pay for the fulfillment or satisfaction of his desire.

Revealed preference in finance 
For financial applications, e.g. portfolio optimization, an investor chooses a financial portfolio which maximizes his/her own utility function, or, equivalently, minimizes his/her risk measure. For example, modern portfolio theory selects variance as a measure of risk; other popular theories are expected utility theory, and prospect theory. To determine a specific utility function for any given investor, one could design a questionnaire procedure with questions in the form: How much would you pay for x% chance of getting y? Revealed preference theory suggests a more direct method: observe a portfolio X* which an investor currently has, and then find a utility function/risk measure such that X* becomes an optimal portfolio.

There has been some controversy concerning whether the utility of a commodity can be measured or not. At one time, it was assumed that the consumer was able to say exactly how much utility he got from the commodity. The economists who made this assumption belonged to the 'cardinalist school' of economics. Presently utility functions, expressing utility as a function of the amounts of the various goods consumed, are treated as either cardinal or ordinal, depending on whether they are or are not interpreted as providing more information than simply the rank ordering of preferences among bundles of goods, such as information concerning the strength of preferences.

Cardinal

Cardinal utility states that the utilities obtained from consumption can be measured and ranked objectively and are representable by numbers. There are fundamental assumptions of cardinal utility. Economic agents should be able to rank different bundles of goods based on their own preferences or utilities, and also sort different transitions of two bundles of goods.

A cardinal utility function can be transformed to another utility function by a positive linear transformation (multiplying by a positive number, and adding some other number); however, both utility functions represent the same preferences.

When cardinal utility is assumed, the magnitude of utility differences is treated as an ethically or behaviorally significant quantity. For example, suppose a cup of orange juice has utility of 120 "utils", a cup of tea has a utility of 80 utils, and a cup of water has a utility of 40 utils. With cardinal utility, it can be concluded that the cup of orange juice is better than the cup of tea by exactly the same amount by which the cup of tea is better than the cup of water. Formally, this means that if a person has a cup of tea, he or she would be willing to take any bet with a probability, p, greater than .5 of getting a cup of juice, with a risk of getting a cup of water equal to 1-p. One cannot conclude, however, that the cup of tea is two thirds of the goodness of the cup of juice, because this conclusion would depend not only on magnitudes of utility differences, but also on the "zero" of utility. For example, if the "zero" of utility was located at -40, then a cup of orange juice would be 160 utils more than zero, a cup of tea 120 utils more than zero. Cardinal utility can be considered as the assumption that utility can be measured by quantifiable characteristics, such as height, weight, temperature, etc.

Neoclassical economics has largely retreated from using cardinal utility functions as the basis of economic behavior. A notable exception is in the context of analyzing choice with conditions of risk (see below).

Sometimes cardinal utility is used to aggregate utilities across persons, to create a social welfare function.

Ordinal

Instead of giving actual numbers over different bundles, ordinal utilities are only the rankings of utilities received from different bundles of goods or services. For example, ordinal utility could tell that having two ice creams provide a greater utility to individuals in comparison to one ice cream but could not tell exactly how much extra utility received by the individual. Ordinal utility, it does not require individuals to specify how much extra utility he or she received from the preferred bundle of goods or services in comparison to other bundles. They are only required to tell which bundles they prefer. 

When ordinal utilities are used, differences in utils (values assumed by the utility function) are treated as ethically or behaviorally meaningless:  the utility index encodes a full behavioral ordering between members of a choice set, but tells nothing about the related strength of preferences. For the above example, it would only be possible to say that juice is preferred to tea to water. Thus, ordinal utility utilizes comparisons, such as "preferred to", "no more", "less than", etc.

If a function  is ordinal, it is equivalent to the function , because taking the 3rd power is an increasing monotone (or monotonic) transformation. This means that the ordinal preference induced by these functions is the same (although they are two different functions).

Constructing utility functions
For many decision models, utility functions are determined by the problem formulation. For some situations, the decision maker's preference must be elicited and represented by a utility (or objective) scalar-valued function. The methods existing for constructing such functions are collected in the proceedings of two dedicated conferences.
The mathematical foundations for the most common types of utility functions — quadratic and additive — were laid down by Gerard Debreu, and the methods for their construction from both ordinal and cardinal data, in particular from interviewing a decision maker, were developed by Andranik Tangian.

Examples

In order to simplify calculations, various alternative assumptions have been made concerning details of human preferences, and these imply various alternative utility functions such as:

 CES (constant elasticity of substitution).
 Isoelastic utility
 Exponential utility
 Quasilinear utility
 Homothetic preferences
 Stone–Geary utility function
 Gorman polar form
 Greenwood–Hercowitz–Huffman preferences
 King–Plosser–Rebelo preferences
 Hyperbolic absolute risk aversion

Most utility functions used for modeling or theory are well-behaved. They are usually monotonic and quasi-concave. However, it is possible for preferences not to be representable by a utility function. An example is lexicographic preferences which are not continuous and cannot be represented by a continuous utility function.

Marginal utility 
Economists distinguish between total utility and marginal utility. Total utility is the utility of an alternative, an entire consumption bundle or situation in life. The rate of change of utility from changing the quantity of one good consumed is termed the marginal utility of that good. Marginal utility therefore measures the slope of the utility function with respect to the changes of one good. Marginal utility usually decreases with consumption of the good, the idea of "diminishing marginal utility". When a good's marginal utility is positive, additional consumption of it increases utility; if zero, the consumer is satiated and indifferent about consuming more; if negative, the consumer would pay to reduce his consumption.

Law of diminishing marginal utility 
Rational individuals only consume additional units of goods if it increases the marginal utility. However, the law of diminishing marginal utility means an additional unit consumed brings a less marginal utility than that brought by the previous unit consumed. For example, drinking one bottle of water makes a thirsty person satisfied; as the consumption of water increases, he may feel begin to feel bad which causes the marginal utility to decrease to zero or even become negative. Furthermore, this is also used to analyze progressive taxes as the greater taxes can result in the loss of utility.

Marginal rate of substitution (MRS) 
Marginal rate of substitution is the slope of the indifference curve, which measures how much an individual is willing to switch from one good to another. Using a mathematic equation, keeping U (x1,x2) constant. Thus, MRS is how much an individual is willing to pay for consuming a greater amount of x1. 

MRS is related to marginal utility. The relationship between marginal utility and MRS is:

Expected utility

Expected utility theory deals with the analysis of choices among risky projects with multiple (possibly multidimensional) outcomes.

The St. Petersburg paradox was first proposed by Nicholas Bernoulli in 1713 and solved by Daniel Bernoulli in 1738. D. Bernoulli argued that the paradox could be resolved if decision-makers displayed risk aversion and argued for a logarithmic cardinal utility function. (Analysis of international survey data during the 21st century has shown that insofar as utility represents happiness, as for utilitarianism, it is indeed proportional to log of income.)

The first important use of the expected utility theory was that of John von Neumann and Oskar Morgenstern, who used the assumption of expected utility maximization in their formulation of game theory.

In finding the probability-weighted average of the utility from each possible outcome:
  EU=[Pr(z)×u(value(z))]+[Pr(y)×u(value(y))]

von Neumann–Morgenstern

Von Neumann and Morgenstern addressed situations in which the outcomes of choices are not known with certainty, but have probabilities associated with them.

A notation for a lottery is as follows: if options A and B have probability p and 1 − p in the lottery, we write it as a linear combination:

More generally, for a lottery with many possible options:

where .

By making some reasonable assumptions about the way choices behave, von Neumann and Morgenstern showed that if an agent can choose between the lotteries, then this agent has a utility function such that the desirability of an arbitrary lottery can be computed as a linear combination of the utilities of its parts, with the weights being their probabilities of occurring.

This is termed the expected utility theorem. The required assumptions are four axioms about the properties of the agent's preference relation over 'simple lotteries', which are lotteries with just two options. Writing  to mean 'A is weakly preferred to B' ('A is preferred at least as much as B'), the axioms are:

 independence: for any three lotteries  and any probability p,  if and only if .

Axioms 3 and 4 enable us to decide about the relative utilities of two assets or lotteries.

In more formal language: A von Neumann–Morgenstern utility function is a function from choices to the real numbers:

which assigns a real number to every outcome in a way that represents the agent's preferences over simple lotteries.
.

Of all the axioms, independence is the most often discarded. A variety of generalized expected utility theories have arisen, most of which omit or relax the independence axiom.

As probability of success
Castagnoli and LiCalzi (1996) and Bordley and LiCalzi (2000) provided another interpretation for Von Neumann and Morgenstern's theory.  Specifically for any utility function, there exists a hypothetical reference lottery with the expected utility of an arbitrary lottery being its probability of performing no worse than the reference lottery. Suppose success is defined as getting an outcome no worse than the outcome of the reference lottery.  Then this mathematical equivalence means that maximizing expected utility is equivalent to maximizing the probability of success. In many contexts, this makes the concept of utility easier to justify and to apply. For example, a firm's utility might be the probability of meeting uncertain future customer expectations.

Indirect utility

An indirect utility function gives the optimal attainable value of a given utility function, which depends on the prices of the goods and the income or wealth level that the individual possesses.

Money

One use of the indirect utility concept is the notion of the utility of money.  The (indirect) utility function for money is a nonlinear function that is bounded and asymmetric about the origin. The utility function is concave in the positive region, representing the phenomenon of diminishing marginal utility.  The boundedness represents the fact that beyond a certain amount money ceases being useful at all, as the size of any economy at that time is itself bounded.  The asymmetry about the origin represents the fact that gaining and losing money can have radically different implications both for individuals and businesses.  The non-linearity of the utility function for money has profound implications in decision-making processes: in situations where outcomes of choices influence utility by gains or losses of money, which are the norm for most business settings, the optimal choice for a given decision depends on the possible outcomes of all other decisions in the same time-period.

Budget constraints 
Individuals' consumptions are constrained by their budget allowance. The graph of budget line is a linear, downward-sloping line between X and Y axes. All the bundles of consumption under the budget line allow individuals to consume without using the whole budget as the total budget is greater than the total cost of bundles (Figure 2).

Slope = -P(x)/P(y)

Constrained utility optimisation 
Rational consumers wish to maximise their utility. However, as they have budget constraints, a change of price would affect the quantity of demand. There are two factors could explain this situation:

 Purchasing Power. Individuals obtain greater purchasing power when the price of a good decreases. The reduction of the price allows individuals to increase their savings so they could afford to buy other products.
 Substitution Effect. If the price of good A decreases, then the good becomes relatively cheaper with respect to its substitutes. Thus, individuals would consume more of good A as the utility would increase by doing so.

Discussion and criticism
Cambridge economist Joan Robinson famously criticized utility for being a circular concept: "Utility is the quality in commodities that makes individuals want to buy them, and the fact that individuals want to buy commodities shows that they have utility". Robinson also stated that because the theory assumes that preferences are fixed this means that utility is not a testable assumption. This is so because if we observe changes of peoples' behavior in relation to a change in prices or a change in budget constraint we can never be sure to what extent the change in behavior was due to the change of price or budget constraint and how much was due to a change of preference. This criticism is similar to that of the philosopher Hans Albert who argued that the ceteris paribus (all else equal) conditions on which the marginalist theory of demand rested rendered the theory itself a meaningless tautology, incapable of being tested experimentally. In essence, a curve of demand and supply (a theoretical line of quantity of a product which would have been offered or requested for given price) is purely ontological and could never have been demonstrated empirically.

Another criticism derives from the assertion that neither cardinal nor ordinal utility are observable empirically in the real world. For the case of cardinal utility it is impossible to measure the degree of satisfaction "quantitatively" when someone consumes or purchases an apple. For ordinal utility, it is impossible to determine what choices were made when someone purchases, for example, an orange. Any act would involve preference over a vast set of choices (such as apple, orange juice, other vegetable, vitamin C tablets, exercise, not purchasing, etc.).

Other questions of what arguments ought to be included in a utility function are difficult to answer, yet seem necessary to understanding utility. Whether people gain utility from coherence of wants, beliefs or a sense of duty is important to understanding their behavior in the utility organon. Likewise, choosing between alternatives is itself a process of determining what to consider as alternatives, a question of choice within uncertainty.

An evolutionary psychology theory is that utility may be better considered as due to preferences that maximized evolutionary fitness in the ancestral environment but not necessarily in the current one.

See also

 Law of demand
 Marginal utility
 Utility maximization problem
 Decision-making software

References

Further reading

External links

Definition of Utility by Investopedia
Anatomy of Cobb-Douglas Type Utility Functions in 3D
Anatomy of CES Type Utility Functions in 3D
Simpler Definition with example from Investopedia
Maximization of Originality - redefinition of classic utility
Utility Model of Marketing - Form, Place , Time 
, Possession and perhaps also Task

 
Choice modelling
Ethical principles